Albert George Henry Morrison (29 January 1909 – 24 September 1997) was an Australian rules footballer who played for Footscray in the VFL during the 1930s and 1940s. He was named at half forward in Footscray's 'Team of the Century'

A versatile player, Morrison debuted in 1928 and when he played his last game in 1946 his career tally of 369 goals was the most ever by a Footscray player. The record lasted for over ten years until surpassed by Jack Collins. Morrison is also in the record books at Footscray as being their first player to kick 10 goals in a match. He achieved the feat in a game against Hawthorn in 1928 on the way to a debut season tally of 50 goals. It was the first of five times that he topped Footscray's goalkicking.

Morrison polled well in the Brownlow Medal during his career, finishing equal 4th in 1936 and equal 3rd in 1938. He was a Footscray Best and Fairest winner twice, in 1933 and 1936.

Morrison signed with Victorian Football Association club Preston in 1939, and served there as playing coach for two years before returning to Footscray in 1941.

References

External links

1909 births
Australian rules footballers from Melbourne
Western Bulldogs players
Western Bulldogs coaches
Charles Sutton Medal winners
Preston Football Club (VFA) players
Preston Football Club (VFA) coaches
1997 deaths
People from Footscray, Victoria